South Africa–Tanzania relations are bilateral relations between South Africa and Tanzania. Both countries are members of the African Union, Southern African Development Community and Commonwealth of Nations.

History

Apartheid 
Tanzania played a big role in South Africa's liberation struggle from the apartheid South African Government. Along with various other regional parties, Tanzania offered itself as a base for those fighting the apartheid government, hosting the forces such as the African National Congress and the Pan African Congress. During the struggle, Tanzania lobbied the international community in Africa and around the world to maintain hard sanctions towards South Africa.

Post-Apartheid 
Tanzania established official diplomatic relations with South Africa Immediately after the end of apartheid in 1994.

Economic Relations 
South Africa has been one of Tanzania's top trading partners after establishing diplomatic relations in 1994.

Foreign-Direct Investment 
South Africa is one of the top contributors of foreign direct investment in Tanzania and in 2023 attributed to about 10% of the total investment in the country. Between 1997 and 2022 about 223 South African companies have invested in approximately US$800 million in Tanzania. These investments range in all industries such as mining, manufacturing, retail, telecommunication, finance etc.

Trade Balance 
South Africa has a strong positive trade balance against Tanzania. The main import from Tanzania include agricultural products and precious metals, while the mail exports to Tanzania range from various manufactured goods, chemicals and machinery. The following table outlines the trade balance in South African rand between the two countries as per the South African Revenue Service:

High Level Visits

Presidential 

 31 May 2015, Jacob Zuma visits Tanzania on a state visit.
 26 October 2015, Jakaya Kikwete visits South Africa on a state visit.
 25 May 2019, John Magufuli visits South Africa for Cyril Ramaphosa's inauguration.
 15 March 2023, Samia Suluhu Hassan visits South Africa on a state visit.

Diplomatic missions 

 Tanzania has a high commission in Pretoria.
 South Africa has a high commission in Dar es Salaam.

High Commissioners of Tanzania to South Africa 

 Ami Ramadhan Mpungwe (1994–1999)
 Emmanuel Mwambulukutu (2002–2009)
 Radhia N.M. Msuya (2010–2016)
 Sylvester Mwakinyuke Sangalala Ambokile (2017–2019)
 Maj Gen Gaudence Salim Milanzi (September 2019–Present)

See also 
 Foreign relations of South Africa
 Foreign relations of Tanzania

References 

 
Bilateral relations of South Africa
Bilateral relations of Tanzania